4C may refer to :

 "4C" (Person of Interest), an episode of the TV series Person of Interest
 4C Array, a cylindrical paraboloid radio telescope at the Mullard Radio Astronomy Observatory
 4C Entity, a consortium to establish a platform for digital rights management schemes
 Alfa Romeo 4C, a car
 Fourth Cambridge Survey of Extra-Terrestrial Radio Sources
 Cape Cod Community College (4Cs)
 4/C, a proposed supertall skyscraper in Seattle, Washington
 LATAM Colombia, a Colombian airline IATA code 
 STD-4C, a classification of cluster mailboxes defined by the United States Postal Service
 4C, a grade of afro-textured hair in the Andre Walker Hair Typing System
 4C, the production code for the 1975 Doctor Who serial The Ark in Space
 The 4 C's or marketing mix, a business tool used in marketing products
 The 4 C's of 21st century skills education:  Collaboration, Communication, Critical thinking, Creativity
 FourCC, a four-character code used in software for identifying an object
 Zen 4c

See also

C (disambiguation)
4 (disambiguation)
 Long March 4C, a Chinese rocket
 Oflag IV-C, a German Army prisoner-of-war camps for officers in World War II in Colditz Castle
 Studio 4°C, a Japanese animation studio
4-C's of Diamond Grading
IVC (disambiguation)
CCCC (disambiguation)
C4 (disambiguation)